John Charles Ditchfield (10 July 1870 – 1947) was an English footballer who played in the Football League for Accrington and Manchester City.

References

1870 births
1947 deaths
English footballers
Association football defenders
English Football League players
Accrington F.C. players
Manchester City F.C. players